St Swithin's Church, Wellow is a Grade II* listed Church of England parish in the Diocese of Southwell and Nottingham in Wellow, Nottinghamshire.

History

The church dates from the 12th century. It was restored in 1878 by Ewan Christian, and a further restoration took place in 1968.

It is in a group of parishes comprising:
St Bartholomew's Church, Kneesall 
St Michael the Archangel's Church, Laxton
Moorhouse Chantry Chapel

Organ

The church has an organ by James Jepson Binns. A specification of the organ can be found on the National Pipe Organ Register.

Clock

The church had an early clock by Richard Roe of Epperstone which was installed in 1699.

References

Grade II* listed churches in Nottinghamshire
Church of England church buildings in Nottinghamshire